Sandra Borgmann (born 25 April 1974) is a German actress.

Biography
Borgmann is originally from Mülheim and studied German, philosophy, and history. She attended the Folkwang University of the Arts in Essen and joined a theater troupe. She has worked as an actress since 1997. She became known for early roles in Oi! Warning and Hotel Elfie. Borgmann frequently portrays the villain in TV roles, such as in Tatort and Polizeiruf 110.

In 2004, Borgmann was nominated at the German Television Awards in the category Best Actress – supporting role, for her performance in that year's Tatort serialized film.

From 2019 to 2020, she played the character of grown-up Elisabeth Doppler in the second season of the Netflix show Dark.

Borgmann lives in Hamburg and has a son.

Selected filmography

Film

Television

References

External links

 
 Sandra Borgmann at filmportal.de
 Sandra Bergmann at Britta Imdahl talent agency

1974 births
Living people
German television actresses
21st-century German actresses
Actresses from Hamburg